Tridenchthonius africanus is a species of pseudoscorpion in the family Tridenchthoniidae.

References

Further reading

 

Tridenchthoniidae
Articles created by Qbugbot
Animals described in 1931